Kelly-Anne is a given name. Notable people with the name include:

Kelly-Ann Baptiste (born 1986), Tobagonian track and field sprint athlete
Kelly-Anne Billingy (born 1986), Trinidad and Tobago female volleyball player
Kellyanne Conway (born 1967) American political consultant
Kellyanne Farquhar, Scottish television actress
Kelly-Anne Lyons (born 1985), American actress
Kelly Anne Shepherd (born 1970), Australian botanist
Kelly-Anne Smith (born 1979), English radio personality and voice actress 
Kelly-Ann Way (born 1964) Canadian retired track cyclist and road bicycle racer
Kelly-Anne Wilson (born 1975), South African fencer. 
Kelly Ann Woodland, Scottish newsreader and journalist